Ibiono-Ibom is a Local Government Area of Akwa Ibom State in the south-south region of Nigeria. It has its administrative headquarters at Oko Ita.

Geography
The territorial unit and geographical area called, addressed and known as Ibiono Ibom consists of 9 clans, 33 groups, and 193 villages. It covers a total land surface of 2761.76 sq. kilometers, with a total estimated population of 385,145.
It is bounded by Odukpani Local Government Area (Cross River State), Arochukwu Local Government Area (Abia State), Itu, Ikono, Uyo and Ini Local Government Areas (Akwa Ibom State).

Cities and towns
Oko Ita is the local government headquarters of Ibiono-Ibom.

A few of many prominent towns include: Obio Ibiono, Okopedi Use Ikot Oku, Idoro, Ididep, Afaha Obio Eno, Ikot Usen, Utit Obio, Ono, Afua, Use Ndon, Ikpanya, Aka Ikot Udo Eno, Ikot Okpoko, Urua Abasi and Itukho.

Administrative areas 
Ibiono Ibom is divided into 9 Clans:

History 
The region of the local government was created out of Itu Local government Area in December 1996.

This area is where the Scottish Missionary Mary Slessor died in 1915. Her Cairn is beautifully located at Use Ikot Oku, where she lived.

Politics 
Politics in Ibiono Ibom is dominated by the people from the central part of Ibiono. The political landscape of the town is dominated by the People's Democratic Party (Nigeria).
The traditional leadership of the people is anchored by the paramount leader, known as "Okuku" of Ibiono Ibom.

Demography
The people are predominantly of the Christian faith.

The main ethnic group of the LGA are the Ibibio people, who speak a dialect of the Ibibio language.  The Ibibio language belongs to the Benue–Congo language family, which forms part of the Niger–Congo group of languages.

Despite the homogeneity of the Ibibio, no central government existed among the people of the present day Ibiono-Ibom LGA prior to the colonial British invasion in 1904.

When Ibiono Ibom LGA was created in 1996, Oko Ita was chosen as the local government headquarters to spread development to all regions of the LGA.

Education 
The current region of Ibiono Ibom in old Itu LGA were the first set of people to encounter Western education in Akwa Ibom State with the establishment of Mission School, Aka Iko Udo Eno, 1939; Mary Slessor secondary school, 1950 and other top flight schools such as the Ididep Science College (formerly Teachers' Training College, Ididep).  Currently various institutions for post primary education have sprung up and spread across the local government.

Some Educational Institutes in the local government include:
 Community Secondary Commercial School Ono
Union Secondary School, Ibiaku
 Ibiono Community High School Edem Urua
Community Secondary school Idoro
Presbyterian Senior Science School Ididep
Community Secondary School Ikpanya
Community Secondary School Ikot Usen
Community Secondary School Ikpa
Comprehensive Secondary School Use Ikot Amama
Secondary School, Ididep
Community Secondary School Itukho
Lott Carey Baptist Secodary School, Afaha Obio Eno

Prominent people from Ibiono Ibom 
Some prominent people of Akwa Ibom State and in Nigeria are from Ibiono Ibom LGA. They include:
Cardinal Ekanem, First Nigeria Roman Catholic Cardinal.
Obong (Major General) Philip Efiong, Akankang Ibiono Ibom. Serving under the Biafran Government from 1967 to 1970, Obong Philip Efiong served as Chief of Logistics, Chief of Staff, Commandant of the Militia, and Chief of General Staff. He was the first Vice President and Second President of the defunct country.
Obong Ntieyong Udo Akpan is another son of the area who served as Secretary to the Government of Biafra. He was a prolific writer and wrote many works among them are "The Wooden Gong", "Public Administration in Nigeria", "The Reservoir", "IniAbasi and the Sacred Ram" and "The Struggle for Secession, 1966–1970: A Personal Account of the Nigerian Civil War". He is also an uncle to Prof. Enefiok Essien(SAN), a Nigerian professor, lawyer, and from 2015 to 2020 the Vice Chancellor of the University of Uyo.
Rt. Hon. Senator Solomon Enang (born 23 August 1962) is a Nigerian politician who represented the Itu and Ibiono Ibom Federal Constituency of Akwa Ibom State in the House of Representatives from 1999 to 2011. He was elected Senator for the Uyo (North East) Senatorial District of Akwa Ibom in the 2011 Federal elections.
Ita Solomon Enang was born on 23 August 1962. He attended the Presbyterian Teachers Training College, Ididep, Akwa Ibom State (1974–1979). He was admitted to the University of Calabar, Calabar in 1980 where he read Law, graduating in 1984. He went on to the Nigerian Law School, Lagos and was called to the Nigerian Bar in 1985. He then entered private practice with his own law firm.

Joe Udofia is a Nigerian entrepreneur and philanthropist. He is the President & CEO of Vandrezzer Energy Services Limited and Chairman of Nigerian Club side, Vandrezzer Football Club. He is also the founder of The Joe Udofia Foundation, a foundation committed to creating opportunities for youth and providing support for the less privileged in the society.
Obong Bassey Albert (OBA) is a Nigerian politician who has been a member of the 8th Senate of Nigeria since June 2015. Previously, he was Commissioner of Finance in Akwa Ibom State from 2007 to 2014. He was first elected to the Senate in March 2015, representing Akwa Ibom North-East Senatorial district.

References

External links 
 Satellite Map of Akwa Ibom State on Google Maps World Gazetteer
 akwaibomnewsonline.com: Akwa Ibom State News from Various News Sources
 www.grab.com.ng: Current News on Ibiono Ibom LGA
 uncommontransformation.tv: Uncommon Transformation multimedia portal 
 
 Bassey Albert

Local Government Areas in Akwa Ibom State
States and territories established in 1987